"Vivid" is BoA's 26th Japanese single which is BoA's first double A-side single to include two PVs for the A-sides. In addition to the track "Kissing You", the single also includes the songs "Sparkling" and "Joyful Smile". The single was released on June 4, 2008. "Kissing You" and "Joyful Smile" are R&B songs while "Sparkling" is consumed as a breakbeat song. The single debuted at #3 with first-day sales of 7,936 copies, according to the Oricon.

"Kissing You" was used as the drama Shichinin no Onna Bengoshi's theme song.

Track listing

CD
 Kissing You - 4:01
 Sparkling - 4:02
 Joyful Smile - 4:06
 Kissing You (Instrumental) - 3:56
 Sparkling (Instrumental) - 3:54
 Joyful Smile (Instrumental) - 3:58

DVD
 Kissing You (Music Clip)
 Sparkling (Music Clip)
 BoA TV 2nd Season　-Kissing You & Sparkling Music Clip Making-

Charts

Oricon Sales Chart (Japan)

References

Songs about kissing
2008 singles
BoA songs
Japanese television drama theme songs
2008 songs
Avex Trax singles
Song articles with missing songwriters